Neri Ricardo Bandiera (born 3 July 1989) is an Argentine professional footballer who plays as a winger for Atlético Grau.

Career
Bandiera's career started with ADIUR in 2008, in 2009 he departed to join Primera B Nacional side Tiro Federal but was released soon after. Following his release from Tiro Federal, he joined Renato Cesarini, a club founded in honour of Renato Cesarini. His stay with the team lasted three years until he left to join Torneo Argentino B side Sarmiento in early 2013, however his stay in Resistencia was short as he left soon after. He signed for Torneo Argentino A's Juventud Unida on 3 August 2013. His debut came on 18 August in an away win against Chaco For Ever.

It took him thirteen league matches until he scored his first goal for the club, it came on 9 March 2014 in a draw versus Libertad. Two more goals followed in 2013–14 before he participated in fourteen games and scored four times in the 2014 Torneo Federal A, a division Juventud Unida moved into at the start of 2014, as he and Juventud won promotion into the 2015 Primera B Nacional after winning Zone 4 in the 2014 Torneo Federal A. He played in forty of the club's forty-two league fixtures in 2015 and scored six goals. In 2016, Bandiera joined Argentine Primera División club Aldosivi.

He went onto make thirty-seven appearances and score six goals in all competitions for Aldosivi in a season that ended with relegation. On 4 July 2017, Bandiera joined Primera División team Belgrano. He made his Belgrano debut on 25 August versus Banfield. Bandiera was signed by Curicó Unido of the Chilean Primera División.

Career statistics
.

References

External links

1989 births
Living people
Footballers from Rosario, Santa Fe
Argentine footballers
Association football wingers
Argentine expatriate footballers
Torneo Argentino A players
Torneo Federal A players
Argentine Primera División players
Primera Nacional players
Chilean Primera División players
Tiro Federal footballers
Sarmiento de Resistencia footballers
Juventud Unida de Gualeguaychú players
Aldosivi footballers
Club Atlético Belgrano footballers
Curicó Unido footballers
Estudiantes de Buenos Aires footballers
Club Atlético Patronato footballers
Barracas Central players
Expatriate footballers in Chile
Argentine expatriate sportspeople in Chile
Argentine people of Italian descent